An election to the electoral county of Dublin–Belgard within Dublin County to Dublin County Council took place on 20 June 1985 as part of that year's Irish local elections. Councillors were elected from local electoral areas on the system of proportional representation by means of the single transferable vote voting for a six-year term of office.

Dublin–Belgard was one of three electoral counties established by the Local Government (Reorganisation) Act 1985.

Results by LEA

Clondalkin

Greenhills

Lucan

Rathfarnam

Tallaght–Oldbawn

Tallaght–Rathcoole

Terenure

External links
 IrelandElection.com
 irishelectionliterature

References

1985 Irish local elections
History of County Dublin